Bamshad or Bāmšād was a musician of Sasanian music during the reign of Khosrow II.

Life and career
Many Shahanshahs of the Sasanian Empire were ardent supporters of music, including the founder of the empire Ardashir I and Bahram V. Khosrow II was the most outstanding patron, his reign being regarded as a golden age of Persian music. Musicians in Khosrow's service include Āzādvar-e Changi, Bamshad, the harpist Nagisa (Nakisa), Ramtin, Sarkash (also Sargis or Sarkas) and Barbad, who was by-far the most famous. These musicians were usually active as minstrels, which were performers who worked as both court poets and musicians; in the Sasanian Empire there was little distinction between poetry and music.

Essentially nothing is known of Bamshad except that he was a noted musician during the reign of Khosrow II. His name comes from his practice of playing music at dawn every day:  "bam" and "shad" translate as "dawn" and "happiness".

The Persian lexicons, for example Dehḵodā's Loḡat-nāma, describe him as a well-known musician equal to Barbad. He is also mentioned in a poem by the Persian poet Manūčehrī.

Notes

References

Sources
Books and Chapters

 
 
  (In )
  (In )
  (In )
 

Journal and Encyclopedia articles

  
  (In )
  (In )
 

7th-century Iranian people
Musicians from the Sasanian Empire